Hello, Sweetheart is a 1935 British comedy film directed by Monty Banks and starring Claude Hulbert, Gregory Ratoff and Jane Carr.

The film was made by the British subsidiary of Warner Brothers at the company's Teddington Studios. It is based on the play The Butter and Egg Man by George S. Kaufman.

Plot
A poultry farmer is persuaded to invest in a film company.

Cast
 Claude Hulbert as Henry Pennyfeather  
 Gregory Ratoff as Joseph Lewis  
 Jane Carr as Babs Beverley  
 Nancy O'Neil as Helen Taylor  
 Olive Blakeney as Daisy Montrose  
 Cyril Smith as Mac McGuire  
 Morris Harvey as F.Q. Morse  
 Felix Aylmer as Peabody  
 Phyllis Stanley 
 Johnny Nitt
 Marriott Edgar 
 Carroll Gibbons as Orchestra Leader  
 Ernest Sefton

References

Bibliography
 Low, Rachael. Filmmaking in 1930s Britain. George Allen & Unwin, 1985.
 Wood, Linda. British Films, 1927-1939. British Film Institute, 1986.

External links

1935 films
British comedy films
1935 comedy films
1930s English-language films
Films directed by Monty Banks
Films shot at Teddington Studios
British black-and-white films
1930s British films